Trúc Bạch Lake is one of the many lakes in the city of Hanoi, the capital of Vietnam. It is known outside Vietnam as the site where future United States politician John McCain landed during the Vietnam War after being shot down.

Trúc Bạch Lake is located northwest of Hanoi's Old Quarter, immediately adjacent to the eastern shore of the city's largest lake, the West Lake (Hồ Tây), a former branch of the Red River whose west bank is nearby. Trúc Bạch Lake was separated from the West Lake by the construction of a narrow dike (Cổ Ngư, "reinforcement") in the 17th century to allow raising fish. The inhabitants of the Truc Yen Village, located on the south shore of the newly formed lake, were in the business of making bamboo blinds and hence cultivated a small variety of bamboo. In 1957 and 1958, major Thanh Niên Road was built between the lakes. In 1730s, the Trịnh Lord Trịnh Giang had Trúc Lâm Palace constructed on the lake shore. The building first served as a pleasure palace but was later converted into a prison for royal concubines found guilty of crime. The silk they produced, known as "Bamboo Village Silk" became famous for its beauty.
 
The lake front is open only along Thanh Niên Road, the other sides are occupied by houses and residential streets. The lake is among the most seriously polluted in Hanoi. Nearby historical sites include: Quán Thánh Temple to the southwest of the lake,  Châu Long Pagoda to the east, An Trì Temple (dedicated to the worship of a hero from the war against the Chinese Yuan Dynasty) on Phó Đức Chính Street, and Cẩu Nhi temple on a small hill near the northern corner of the lake.

Trúc Bạch War Monument 
On October 26, 1967, during the Vietnam War, US Navy aviator John McCain was shot down by an anti-aircraft missile on a mission against a Hanoi power plant and parachuted wounded into Trúc Bạch Lake. He was dragged out of the water and captured by city residents angry at having seen the area laid to waste by previous U.S. attacks. He was later taken away as a prisoner of war. A monument commemorating capture of "Tchn Sney Ma Can" was erected at the western shore on Thanh Niên Road. The translation inscribed on the memorial; "On 26 October 1967 near Truc Bach Lake in the capital, Hanoi, the citizens and military caught Pilot John Sidney McCain. The US Navy Air Force Aviator was flying aircraft A4, which crashed near Yen Phu power station. This was one of ten aircraft shot down that same day."

References

External links
 Article on the lake's history at Hanoi municipal website
The role of aquaculture in pollution-remediation in Tay Lake and Truc Bach Lake of Ha Noi, University of Vietnam (Microsoft Word document)

Lakes of Hanoi
Lakes of Vietnam
Oxbow lakes